Okha is a town and the administrative center of Okhinsky District of Sakhalin Oblast, Russia. Population:

Geography

History
It was founded shortly after the discovery of petroleum in the area in 1880, initially under the name Okhe. The name is derived from an Ainu word meaning Bad Water. Industrial exploitation of the petroleum reserves began in 1923, during the Japanese occupation of Sakhalin from 1920-1925. During this time the town was called  or  depending on Kanji used. Town status was granted to it in 1938.

Climate

The town suffered significant damage in the 1995 Neftegorsk earthquake that occurred on May 28, and was used as pivotal base for rescuers deployed to Neftegorsk, which was destroyed to the extent that it was not rebuilt. A number of survivors of Neftegorsk were later transferred to Okha. Another smaller earthquake hit the town on May 10, 2005, but there were no fatalities or significant damage.

Administrative and municipal status
Within the framework of administrative divisions, Okha serves as the administrative center of Okhinsky District and is subordinated to it. As a municipal division, the town of Okha and ten rural localities of Okhinsky District are incorporated as Okhinsky Urban Okrug.

Economy
Okha, along with the oblast's administrative center Yuzhno-Sakhalinsk, is the center of Sakhalin's petroleum industry. An oil pipeline and gas main runs from Okha to Komsomolsk-on-Amur on the Russian mainland. A number of oil wells exist in close proximity to the town, mainly controlled by the company Rosneft.

Transportation
The town is the northern end point for the island's road system. There was a rail connection to the island's narrow-gauge rail network at Nogliki; however, this was closed in 2006.

There is an airport in Okha with service to Khabarovsk and Yuzhno-Sakhalinsk.

References

Notes

Sources

External links

Cities and towns in Sakhalin Oblast